"Evil on Your Mind" is the name of a popular Country music song, originally made famous by Grand Ole Opry star Jan Howard in 1966.  The song was written by her husband at the time, songwriter Harlan Howard.

In the mid-'60s, Jan Howard was not acquiring any significant hits. Only one of her songs hit the Top 20: in 1960, "The One You Slip Around With" hit No. 13. In 1966, Howard wrote and released her first single of the year, "Evil on Your Mind". The song hit the Top 5 on the Billboard Country music charts, peaking at No. 5 there. 
An album of the same name was released that year, featuring Howard's big hit. A successful follow-up single entitled "Bad Seed" hit the Top 10 that year. The song set the stage for a number of Top 20 and Top 10 hits that Howard would have as a solo and duet artist between 1966 and 1971.

Background
The song talks about a husband trying to convince his wife to visit her sister out west, but the narrator (the wife) notices that something is going on, which her husband is trying to hide. She believes he is thinking of having an affair, which she calls "evil on your mind".

Cover Versions
Ella Fitzgerald recorded this song on her 1968 Capitol recording "Misty Blue", where it is attributed to Harlan Howard of Wilderness Music.

A rock music group named The Stumbleweeds recorded Howard's "Evil on Your Mind".

Answer Song
An answer song version was recorded by Burl Ives as "Evil Off My Mind" and became a modest country hit later that year, peaking at #47 in Billboard. The Ives record was one of the handful of answer songs by a male vocalist to a female star's hit; generally it was the other way around.

Song in Popular Culture
The song has been featured in the book Heartaches By the Number: The 500 Greatest Country Singles.

Chart performance

References

1966 songs
Jan Howard songs
Songs written by Harlan Howard
Song recordings produced by Owen Bradley
1966 singles
Decca Records singles